The 2011–12 Croatian Women's First Football League (Prva hrvatska nogometna liga za žene) was the twenty first season of Croatian Women's First Football League, the national championship for women's association football teams in Croatia, since its establishment in 1992. The season started on 28 August 2011 and ended on 20 May 2012.

The league was contested by eight teams and played in a two-stage format. Firs stage was played in a double round robin format, with each team playing every other team two times over 14 rounds. In a second stage teams were divided in two groups according to the table standings.

Teams

Regular season

Table

Results

Play-offs

Championship play-offs

League table

Results

Relegation play-offs

League table

Results

References

Croatian Women's First Football League seasons
Croatia
women
Football
Football